D. Reidel was an academic publishing company based in Dordrecht established in the 1960s which was independent until the 1990s.

History
Reidel was established in the 1960s, with a focus on publishing research in physics. Reidel himself had been trained under an ex-Elsevier manager, M. D. Frank, who considered third generation Dutch publishers like Reidel to be the "grandchildren" of the German publishing company, Akademische Verlagsgesellschaft of Leipzig, where Frank himself was trained. "In the 1960s a mainly physics programme was established by D. Reidel Publishing Company in Dordrecht. Other players included Dr. W. Junk, P. Noordhoff and M. Nijhoff, who were all to become part of a group that began in the 1970s and which resulted in the establishment of Kluwer Academic Publishers. Publishers like Reidel, trained by Frank — who in turn had had his training at Aka — were termed by Frank 'grandchildren of Aka.'"

In the 1990s Reidel joined with Kluwer as Kluwer/Reidel, in 2003 being purchased by Cinven and Candover. In spring 2004, Cinven and Candover purchased Springer, merging the operations of all the publishers into one conglomerate, Springer Science+Business Media, now "the second largest commercial scholarly publisher in the world" after Elsevier.

Aka had been co-founded by Walter Jalowicz (who changed his name to Johnson and later worked for Academic Press in New York) and his son-in-law K. Jacoby, together with the physicist (and spy) Paul Rosbaud (later of Butterworth), and chemist E. Proskauer (later vice-president of John Wiley & Sons).

References

External links 
 Aka Verlag — official website of Akademische Verlagsgesellschaft AKA GmbH

Book publishing companies of the Netherlands
Mass media in Dordrecht
Defunct publishing companies of the Netherlands